Dušan Mićić (born 29 November 1984) is a Serbian former footballer who played as a midfielder.

Career
Born in Novi Sad, he is one of the players who appeared relatively late in the highest ranks of Serbian football, at the age of 29. He started in the Second League of Serbia and Montenegro with OFK Mladenovac in 2003. The following season he played with FK Inđija, and later played abroad in the Premier League of Bosnia and Herzegovina with FK Rudar Ugljevik. He later played with various Serbian clubs in lower-tier leagues. In 2009, he played in the Serbian First League with Proleter Novi Sad.

In 2010, he played in the Montenegrin First League with Rudar Pljevlja. In his debut season with Rudar he assisted in securing the league title. As a result, he featured in the 2010–11 UEFA Champions League against S.P. Tre Fiori, and PFC Litex Lovech. The following season he transferred to FK Grbalj. He returned to Proleter Novi Sad in 2013, and ultimately joined Voždovac in summer of 2013, when this club competed in the Serbian SuperLiga.

He played with FK Napredak Kruševac until the end of the 2013–14 season. As of January 2015 he joined the Belgium Lierse S.K., but due to appointing a new coach, he already was released of his contract after a couple of weeks on February 2. Returning to Serbia, Mićić signed for Borac Čačak. After a great first half of season 2015–16, in which Mićić played an instrumental role in defensive midfield, helping Borac to climb to 3rd place and to reach quarter-final of cup, Dušan signed a -year deal with Vojvodina. Throughout his time with Vojvodina he participated in the 2016–17 UEFA Europa League against FK Bokelj, Connah's Quay Nomads F.C., FC Dinamo Minsk, and AZ Alkmaar.

On 5 January 2017 Mićić and Vojvodina mutually terminated the contract. He immediately inked a deal abroad in the Uzbekistan Super League with FC Bunyodkor. During his tenure with Bunyodkor he featured in the 2017 AFC Champions League. After a twelve-month term with Bunyodkor, he returned to the Serbian SuperLiga to play with FK Radnik Surdulica. He later had stints with FK Radnički Niš, and returned to Proleter Novi Sad. During his time with Radnički he played in the 2018–19 UEFA Europa League against Gżira United, and Maccabi Tel Aviv F.C.

In 2019, he played in the Canadian Soccer League with the Serbian White Eagles FC. He re-signed with Serbian White Eagles for the 2021 season.

Honours
Rudar Pljevlja
Montenegrin First League: 2009–10
Montenegrin Cup: 2010, 2011

References

External links
 Dušan Micić at jelenfootball.com
 
 

1984 births
Living people
Footballers from Novi Sad
Association football midfielders
Serbian footballers
OFK Mladenovac players
FK Inđija players
FK Rudar Ugljevik players
FK ČSK Čelarevo players
FK Proleter Novi Sad players
FK Rudar Pljevlja players
OFK Grbalj players
FK Voždovac players
FK Napredak Kruševac players
FK Borac Čačak players
Lierse S.K. players
FK Radnik Surdulica players
FK Radnički Niš players
FC Bunyodkor players
Serbian White Eagles FC players
Premier League of Bosnia and Herzegovina players
Serbian First League players
Serbian SuperLiga players
Belgian Pro League players
Montenegrin First League players
Uzbekistan Super League players
Canadian Soccer League (1998–present) players
Serbian expatriate footballers
Serbian expatriate sportspeople in Belgium
Expatriate footballers in Belgium
Serbian expatriate sportspeople in Uzbekistan
Expatriate footballers in Uzbekistan